Gustavo Núñez (born in Montevideo, February 15, 1965) is a Uruguayan bassoonist trained at Musikhochschule Hannover (Prof. Klaus Thunemann) and the Royal College of Music (Kerry Camden). He has served as principal bassoon of the Royal Concertgebouw Orchestra, together with Ronald Karten, since 1995.

Núñez was previously a member of the Simón Bolívar Symphony Orchestra (1979–81), the orchestra of the Staatstheater Darmstadt (1988–1989) and the Bamberg Symphony Orchestra (1989–95).

Currently, he holds a professorship at the Robert Schumann Hochschule in Düsseldorf, Germany.

Núñez gives masterclasses and has made solo appearances in the US, Canada, various South American countries, the UK, France, Germany, Italy, Spain, Finland, Australia, South Korea and Japan and is considered to be one of the leading bassoonists of his generation.

Competition record
 1987 Geneva IMC, Prix Suisse.
 1987 Carl Maria von Weber IBC, 1st prize

Recordings 
 Vivaldi - 6 Bassoon Concertos. Gustavo Núñez, Academy of St Martin in the Fields. PENTATONE PTC 5186539 (2016)
 The Barber of Neville. Wind concertos by Howard Blake. Sir Neville Marriner, Andrew Marriner, Jaime Martin, Gustavo Núñez, Academy of St Martin in the Fields. PENTATONE PTC 5186506 (2013)
 Mozart - Wind Concertos. Jacob Slagter, Emily Beynon, Alexei Ogrintchouk, Henk Rubingh, Gustavo Núñez, Concertgebouw Chamber Orchestra. PENTATONE PTC 5186079 (2005)

References
  Royal Concertgebouw Orchestra

Uruguayan classical bassoonists
Players of the Royal Concertgebouw Orchestra
1965 births
Living people
Alumni of the Royal College of Music
Hochschule für Musik, Theater und Medien Hannover alumni